The End of the Night is a 1989 Italian crime drama film written and directed by Davide Ferrario, at his directorial debut. It was entered into the main competition at the 1989 San Sebastián International Film Festival. It is loosely based on a crime event happened in Veneto in 1986.

Cast  
Claudio Bigagli as Claudio
Dario Parisini as Vincenzo 
Alessandro Baldinotti as Beppe  
Albino Bignamini as Giovanni
John Sayles as  Wayne
 Mario Valdemarin as Meroni
 Rosanna D'Andrea as Lucia
Massimo Mazzucco  as Psychologist
    Adriano Micantoni 
    Giovanni Lindo Ferretti

References

External links

Italian crime drama films
Films directed by Davide Ferrario
1989 directorial debut films
Italian films based on actual events
1980s crime drama films
1989 crime drama films
1989 films
1980s Italian-language films
1980s Italian films